"I'll Get By" is a song by American singer Eddie Money, released in 1991 as the second single from his eighth studio album Right Here. It was written by Antonina Armato, Andy Hill and Money, and produced by Keith Olsen and Money, with additional production by Randy D. Jackson. "I'll Get By" reached No. 21 on the US Billboard Hot 100 and remained in the charts for 20 weeks. It was Money's last Top 40 single on the chart. The song's music video was dedicated to Bill Graham.

Reception
Upon release, Larry Flick of Billboard wrote: "Money has a good shot at reviving top 40 interest thanks to this mournful pop/rock ballad. His well-worn voice provides a wordly, affecting edge." In a review of Right Here, Joe Konz of The Indianapolis Star wrote: "The album's nominal slow song, "I'll Get By", could almost be characterized as tender. Almost. "I'll Get By" is probably as good as [Money] gets when he's out of his league." Dana Tofig of the Hartford Courant considered the song "an acceptable but predictable ballad".

Track listing
Cassette single
"I'll Get By" - 2:56
"Think Twice" - 3:55

CD single (US promo)
"I'll Get By" - 3:31

Charts

References

1991 songs
1991 singles
Eddie Money songs
Columbia Records singles
Songs written by Antonina Armato
Songs written by Andy Hill (composer)
Songs written by Eddie Money
Song recordings produced by Keith Olsen